Henry Frederick Strohecker (October 15, 1905, Macon, Georgia - November 14, 1988, Coral Gables, Florida) was an American entomologist who specialised in Coleoptera especially Endomychidae.

External links
UFL Biography
UFL Collection

Coleopterists
American entomologists
People from Macon, Georgia
1905 births
1988 deaths
People from Coral Gables, Florida
20th-century American zoologists